Stone tossing may refer to 
Stone skipping, a practice of throwing rocks to bounce on a water surface
Stone throwing, a criminal battery offense